Lake Williams is an unincorporated community in Kidder County, North Dakota, United States.

References

Unincorporated communities in Kidder County, North Dakota
Unincorporated communities in North Dakota